Tompkins County is a county located in the U.S. state of New York. As of the 2020 census, the population was 105,740. The county seat is Ithaca. The name is in honor of Daniel D. Tompkins, who served as Governor of New York and Vice President of the United States.

Tompkins County comprises the Ithaca Metropolitan Statistical Area. It is home to Cornell University, Ithaca College and Tompkins Cortland Community College.

History 

When counties were established in the British Province of New York in 1683, the present Tompkins County was part of Albany County. This was an enormous county, including the northern part of New York State as well as all of the present State of Vermont and, in theory, extending westward to the Pacific Ocean. This county was reduced in size on July 3, 1766, by the creation of Cumberland County, and further on March 16, 1770, by the creation of Gloucester County, both containing territory now in Vermont.

On March 12, 1772, what was left of Albany County was split into three parts, one remaining under the name Albany County. One of the other pieces, Tryon County, contained the western portion (and thus, since no western boundary was specified, theoretically still extended west to the Pacific). The eastern boundary of Tryon County was approximately five miles west of the present city of Schenectady, and the county included the western part of the Adirondack Mountains and the area west of the West Branch of the Delaware River. The area then designated as Tryon County now includes 37 counties of New York State. The county was named for William Tryon, colonial governor of New York.

In the years prior to 1776, most of the Loyalists in Tryon County fled to Canada. In 1784, following the peace treaty that ended the American Revolutionary War, the name of Tryon County was changed to Montgomery County in honor of the general, Richard Montgomery, who had captured several places in Canada and died attempting to capture the city of Quebec, replacing the name of the hated British governor.

In 1789, Montgomery County was reduced in size by the splitting off of Ontario County. The actual area split off from Montgomery County was much larger than the present county, also including the present Allegany, Cattaraugus, Chautauqua, Erie, Genesee, Livingston, Monroe, Niagara, Orleans, Steuben, Wyoming, Yates, and part of Schuyler and Wayne counties.

Herkimer County was one of three counties split off from Montgomery County (the others being Otsego and Tioga counties) in 1791.
Onondaga County was formed in 1794 by the splitting of Herkimer County.

Cayuga County was formed in 1799 by the splitting of Onondaga County. This county was, however, much larger than the present Cayuga County. It also included the territory of the present Seneca and Tompkins counties.

In 1804, Seneca County was formed by the splitting of Cayuga County.

On April 7, 1817, Tompkins County was created by combining portions of Seneca and the remainder of Cayuga County. The county was named after then Vice-President (to President James Monroe) and former New York Governor Daniel Tompkins. Tompkins almost certainly never visited the county named for him.

In 1854, the county lost the town of Hector and the west line of lots in Newfield to the newly formed Schuyler County, New York.

Geography 

Tompkins County is in the west central part of New York State, south of Syracuse and northwest of Binghamton. It is usually geographically grouped with the Finger Lakes region, but some locals consider themselves to be part of Central New York or the Southern Tier.

Adjacent counties 

 Cayuga County - north
 Cortland County - east
 Tioga County - south
 Chemung County - southwest
 Schuyler County - west
 Seneca County - northwest

Major highways 

  New York State Route 13
  New York State Route 13A
  New York State Route 34
  New York State Route 34B
  New York State Route 38
  New York State Route 79
  New York State Route 89
  New York State Route 96
  New York State Route 96B
  New York State Route 222
  New York State Route 227
  New York State Route 327
  New York State Route 366
  New York State Route 392

Demographics 

As of the census of 2000, there were 96,501 people, 36,420 households, and 19,120 families residing in the county. The population density was 203 people per square mile (78/km2). There were 38,625 housing units at an average density of 81 per square mile (31/km2). The racial makeup of the county was 85.50% White, 3.64% African American, 0.28% Native American, 7.19% Asian, 0.04% Pacific Islander, 1.09% from other races, and 2.26% from two or more races. Hispanic or Latino of any race were 3.08% of the population. 12.4% were of German, 11.7% English, 11.1% Irish, 9.2% Italian and 6.0% American ancestry according to Census 2000. 2.85% of the population reported speaking Spanish at home, while 1.86% speak Chinese, 1.07% Korean, and 1.00% French.

There were 36,420 households, out of which 25.80% had children under the age of 18 living with them, 41.20% were married couples living together, 8.20% had a female householder with no husband present, and 47.50% were non-families. 32.50% of all households were made up of individuals, and 8.10% had someone living alone who was 65 years of age or older. The average household size was 2.32 and the average family size was 2.93.

In the county, the population was spread out, with 19.00% under the age of 18, 26.00% from 18 to 24, 26.20% from 25 to 44, 19.30% from 45 to 64, and 9.60% who were 65 years of age or older. The median age was 29 years. For every 100 females there were 97.60 males. For every 100 females age 18 and over, there were 95.20 males.

The median income for a household in the county was $37,272, and the median income for a family was $53,041. Males had a median income of $35,420 versus $27,686 for females. The per capita income for the county was $19,659. About 6.80% of families and 17.60% of the population were below the poverty line, including 11.00% of those under age 18 and 5.40% of those age 65 or over.

2020 Census

Communities

Larger Settlements

Towns 

 Caroline
 Danby
 Dryden
 Enfield
 Groton
 Ithaca
 Lansing
 Newfield
 Ulysses

Hamlets 
 Caroline Center
 Enfield Center
 Etna
 Podunk

Government and politics

|}

Tompkins County was once a reliably Republican county. From 1856 to 1980, the only Democratic candidates to carry it in a presidential election were Woodrow Wilson in 1912 and Lyndon B. Johnson in 1964. However, Democrats have won Tompkins County in every presidential election since 1984, helped by the dominant presence of Cornell University in Ithaca. In 2008, Tompkins County was the only county in New York State in which Senator Barack Obama beat Senator Hillary Clinton in the Democratic primary.  In the 2008 United States presidential election, Obama won the county by a 41% margin over John McCain, with Obama winning by 25.5% statewide. It was his highest percentage by county in upstate New York. In 2016 the county strongly supported Clinton over Trump (67.7% to 24.3%), but was surrounded by Trump-supporting counties. It swung even further to Joe Biden in 2020, who took 73.5% to 24.3% for Trump, the highest voteshare it has given any candidate since 1956 when incumbent president Dwight D. Eisenhower won the county with 78.3% of the vote.

The Tompkins County Legislature consists of fifteen members, each from a single-member district. In November 2014, the Tompkins County legislature unanimously adopted a resolution recognizing freedom from domestic violence as a fundamental human right. In doing so, Tompkins County became the first rural county in the United States to pass such a resolution.

Education 

There are three institutions of higher education in Tompkins County:
 Cornell University in City of Ithaca
 Ithaca College in the Town of Ithaca
 Tompkins-Cortland Community College in the Town of Dryden

The county is served by several school districts (the largest being Ithaca City School District), and several public libraries including the  Tompkins County Public Library, the Southworth Library and the Ulysses Philomathic Library.

See also 

 List of counties in New York
 National Register of Historic Places listings in Tompkins County, New York

Notes

References 

 Jane M. Dieckmann, A Short History of Tompkins County (Ithaca, 1986)
 W. Glenn Norris, The Origin of Place Names in Tompkins County (Ithaca, 1951)
 The Towns of Tompkins County, Jane M. Dieckmann ed., (Ithaca, 1998)

Further reading

External links 

 
 

 
1817 establishments in New York (state)
Populated places established in 1817
Counties of Appalachia